"Say You Love Me" is a song recorded by English singer Char Avell featuring. It was released on 23 February 2012 by Tiffin Beats Records.

Composition and release
Say You Love Me was produced by Stranger and fuses the Punjabi vocals of Junai Kaden with Char Avell's R&B vocals.

The single was released by Tiffin Beats Records on 23 February 2012.

References

External links

2012 singles
2012 songs
British contemporary R&B songs
Char Avell songs